Sign of the Beast is a 1981 Finnish drama film directed by Jaakko Pakkasvirta. It is based on the 1946 book A Gloomy Soliloquy by Olavi Paavolainen, based on his war diaries written during the Winter War and the Continuation War. The film was selected as the Finnish entry for the Best Foreign Language Film at the 54th Academy Awards, but was not accepted as a nominee.

Cast
 Esko Salminen as Kaarlo
 Irina Milan as Karin
 Tom Wentzel as Helmut von Stein
 Hannu Lauri as Olavi
 Vesa-Matti Loiri as Usko
 Jukka-Pekka Palo as Lieutenant Valonen
 Esa Pakarinen Jr. as War Photographer
 Martti Pennanen as General
 Yrjö Parjanne as Captain
 Kalevi Kahra as Seargeant Major

See also
 List of submissions to the 54th Academy Awards for Best Foreign Language Film
 List of Finnish submissions for the Academy Award for Best Foreign Language Film

References

External links
 

1981 films
1981 drama films
Films based on non-fiction books
Finnish drama films
1980s Finnish-language films